Giorgio Mondino (7 September 1941 in Domodossola - 23 January 2021 in Turin) was an Italian politician.

Biography
He served as a Deputy from 1976 to 1983. Mondino died from COVID-19 in 2021.

References

1941 births
2021 deaths
Deaths from the COVID-19 pandemic in Piedmont
Deputies of Legislature VII of Italy
Deputies of Legislature VIII of Italy
People from Domodossola